The following is a list of episodes for the British sitcom To the Manor Born, that first aired on BBC1 from 30 September 1979 to 29 November 1981, and for a one-off special on 25 December 2007.

Each episode from the original series is thirty minutes long. The episodes were not originally broadcast with episode titles, although many have unofficial working titles. The first series aired for seven episodes on Sundays at 8.45pm, the second series for six episodes on Sundays at 8.35pm and the seven-episode Series Three on Sundays at 7.15pm. The Christmas special aired at 8.00pm. All episodes aired on BBC1. In 2007, a one-hour Christmas Day special, featuring Penelope Keith, Peter Bowles, Angela Thorne and Gerald Sim reprising their original roles, aired at 9.30pm on BBC One.

Several episodes received high audience figures. In 1979, the last episode of the first series received 23.95 million viewers, the fourth-highest figures for any programme in the UK in the 1970s and the highest for a non-live event. The following year, 21.55 million people watched the series two finale, the fifth-highest viewing figure for the 1980s. The 1981 finale, when Audrey and Richard marry, received 17.80 million viewers. The 2007 Christmas Special was watched by 10.25 million viewers, and was the 6th most watched programme for that week.

Series overview

Episodes

Series 1 (1979)

Christmas Special (1979)

Series 2 (1980)

Series 3 (1981)

Christmas Special (2007)

References

External links
To the Manor Born at British TV Comedy

To the Manor Born episodes